Wenquan is a town in  Jimo City in eastern Shandong province, China, located about  east of Jimo's city centre and more than twice that distance northeast of Qingdao. , it has 28 villages under its administration.

See also 
List of township-level divisions of Shandong

References 

Township-level divisions of Shandong
Geography of Qingdao
Subdistricts of the People's Republic of China